Kaňovice is a municipality and village in Frýdek-Místek District in the Moravian-Silesian Region of the Czech Republic. It has about 300 inhabitants.

Etymology
Kaňovice was named after an official named Káňa (Kania), who was commissioned to establish the village.

Geography
Kaňovice is located in the Moravian-Silesian Foothills, on its border with the Ostrava Basin. It lies in the historical region of Cieszyn Silesia.

History
The village was established in 1613 of the initiative of Jan Bruntálský of Vrbno, the owner of the Friedek state country. In 1636, the village had 22 homesteads, a mill and a pond.

After World War I and fall of Austria-Hungary it became a part of Czechoslovakia. In March 1939 it became a part of Protectorate of Bohemia and Moravia. After World War II it was restored to Czechoslovakia.

Sights
The Chapel of Saint Hedwig was built in 1868.

References

External links

Villages in Frýdek-Místek District
Cieszyn Silesia